Haseman's gecko (Gonatodes hasemani) is a species of lizard in the family Sphaerodactylidae. The species is indigenous to northern South America.

Etymology
The specific name, hasemani, is in honor of American ichthyologist John Diederich Haseman, who collected specimens in South America (1907–1910) for Carnegie Museum (now Carnegie Museum of Natural History).

Geographic range
G. hasemani is native to northern Bolivia (Pando, Beni), northern Brazil (Acre, Amazonas, Mato Grosso, Pará, Rondônia), southeastern Colombia (Vaupés), and eastern Peru.

Habitat
The preferred natural habitat of G. hasemani is forest.

Description

Reproduction
G. hasemani is oviparous.

Parasites
G. hasemani is a host for parasitic worms of the genera Mesocestoides and Skrjabinelazia.

References

Further reading
Amaral A ("1932") (1933). "Estudos sobre Lacertilios neotropicos. I. Novos gêneros e espécies de lagartos do Brasil ". Memórias do Instituto Butantan 7: 51–75. (Gonatodes spinulosus, new species, p. 56). (in Portuguese).
Ávila-Pires TCS (1995). "Lizards of Brazilian Amazonia (Reptilia: Squamata)". Zoologische Verhandelingen (299): 1–706. (Gonatodes hasemani, p. 268).
Gamble T, Simons AM, Colli GR, Vitt LJ (2008). "Tertiary climate change and the diversification of the Amazonian gecko genus Gonatodes (Sphaerodactylidae, Squamata)". Molecular Phylogeny and Evolution 46 (1): 269–277.
Griffin LE (1917). "A List of the South American Lizards of the Carnegie Museum, With Descriptions of Four New Species". Annals of the Carnegie Museum 11: 304-320 + Plates XXXII-XXXV. (Gonatodes hasemani, new species, pp. 304–306 + Plate XXXII, Figures 1-3).
Ribeiro-Júnior MA (2015). "Catalogue of distribution of lizards (Reptilia: Squamata) from the Brazilian Amazonia. II. Gekkonidae, Phyllodactylidae, Sphaerodactylidae". Zootaxa 3981 (1): 001–055.

Gonatodes
Reptiles described in 1917